Stewardship is a theological belief that humans are responsible for the world, humanity, and the gifts and resources that have been entrusted to us. Believers in stewardship are usually people who believe in one God who created the universe and all that is within it, also believing that they must take care of creation and look after it. Creation includes animals and the environment. Many religions and denominations have various degrees of support for environmental stewardship.   It can have political implications, such as in Christian Democracy.

Many moderate and progressive Roman Catholics, Orthodox Christians, and Evangelical Protestants see some form of environmentalism as a consequence of stewardship.  In Jewish, Christian and Muslim traditions, stewardship refers to the way time, talents, material possessions, or wealth are used or given for the service of God.

Some pagan or secular views include a Gaia philosophy which accepts the Earth as a holy being or goddess.

The Jewish holiday of Tu Bishvat, or "the New Year of the Trees," (Rosh Hashanah La-Ilanot") is also known as Jewish Arbor Day. Some want to expand it to a more global environmental focus.

A biblical world view of stewardship can be consciously defined as: "Utilising and managing all resources God provides for the glory of God and the betterment of His creation." The central essence of biblical world view stewardship is managing everything God brings into the believer's life in a manner that honors God and impacts eternity.

Stewardship begins and ends with the understanding of God's ownership of all:
"I am the Alpha and the Omega, the First and the Last, the Beginning and the End." (Revelation 22:13)
"The earth is the Lord's, and everything in it, the world, and all who live in it." (Psalm 24:1)
"To the Lord your God belong the heavens, even the highest heavens, the earth and everything in it." (Deuteronomy 10:14)
"The land must not be sold permanently, because the land is mine and you are but aliens and my tenants." (Leviticus 25:23)
"Who has a claim against me that I must pay? Everything under heaven belongs to me." (Job 41:11)

Stewardship is further supported and sustained theologically on the understanding of God's holiness as found in such verse as: Genesis 1:2, Psalm 104, Psalm 113, 1 Chronicles 29:10-20, Colossians 1:16, and Revelation 1:8.

There is a strong link between stewardship and environmentalism. Environmental stewardship is typically thought of as entailing reducing human impacts into the natural world. Philosopher Neil Paul Cummins wrote that humans have a special stewardship role on the planet as those who, through their technology, can save life from otherwise certain elimination. This is a modern-day interpretation of Noah's Ark, the cornerstone of human stewardship being technological protection and regulation.

Christian views
Christian Stewardship refers to the responsibility that Christians have in maintaining and using wisely the gifts that God has bestowed. God wishes human beings to be his collaborators in the work of creation, redemption and sanctification. Increasingly this has referred to environmental protectionism. This also includes traditional Christian Ministries that share the resources of treasure, time and talent.

Biblical references
An example of stewardship is in Genesis 2:15. "And the LORD God took the man, and put him into the garden of Eden to dress it and to keep it."

The concept is also seen in Leviticus 25:1-5  "The LORD said to Moses on Mount Sinai, 2 "Speak to the Israelites and say to them: 'When you enter the land I am going to give you, the land itself must observe a Sabbath to the LORD. 3 For six years sow your fields, and for six years prune your vineyards and gather their crops. 4 But in the seventh year the land is to have a Sabbath of rest, a Sabbath to the LORD. Do not sow your fields or prune your vineyards. 5 Do not reap what grows of itself or harvest the grapes of your untended vines. The land is to have a year of rest."  The implication is that the land is not to be exhausted or abused for short-term gains.

Stewardship in Christianity follows from the belief that human beings are created by the same God who created the entire universe and everything in it. To look after the Earth, and thus God's dominion, is the responsibility of the Christian steward.

A useful quote explaining stewardship can be found in Psalm 24:1: "The Earth is the Lord's and all that is in it, the world, and those who live in it".

A broader concept of stewardship is illustrated in Jesus’ parable of the "talents", which refer to an amount of money but by implication (and by common use of the word in English) as "abilities."

Matthew 25.14-30 –

14 "Again, it will be like a man going on a journey, who called his servants and entrusted his property to them.
15 To one he gave five talents of money, to another two talents, and to another one talent, each according to his ability. Then he went on his journey.
16 The man who had received the five talents went at once and put his money to work and gained five more.
17 So also, the one with the two talents gained two more.
18 But the man who had received the one talent went off, dug a hole in the ground and hid his master's money.
19 After a long time the master of those servants returned and settled accounts with them.
20 The man who had received the five talents brought the other five. 'Master,' he said, 'you entrusted me with five talents. See, I have gained five more.' 
21 His master replied, 'Well done, good and faithful servant! You have been faithful with a few things; I will put you in charge of many things. Come and share your master's happiness!' 
22 The man with the two talents also came. 'Master,' he said, 'you entrusted me with two talents; see, I have gained two more.' 
23 His master replied, 'Well done, good and faithful servant! You have been faithful with a few things; I will put you in charge of many things. Come and share your master's happiness!' 
24 Then the man who had received the one talent came. 'Master,' he said, 'I knew that you are a hard man, harvesting where you have not sown and gathering where you have not scattered seed.
25 So I was afraid and went out and hid your talent in the ground. See, here is what belongs to you.' 
26 His master replied, 'You wicked, lazy servant! So you knew that I harvest where I have not sown and gather where I have not scattered seed?
27 Well then, you should have put my money on deposit with the bankers, so that when I returned I would have received it back with interest.
28  'Take the talent from him and give it to the one who has the ten talents.
29 For everyone who has will be given more, and he will have an abundance. Whoever does not have, even what he has will be taken from him.
30 And throw that worthless servant outside, into the darkness, where there will be weeping and gnashing of teeth.' 

Additionally, frequent references to the "tithe", or giving of a portion are found throughout the Bible as part of the Jewish law.  The tithe represents the returning to God a significant, specific, and intentional portion of material gain; under the Jewish law, the first ten percent of one's food product (produce or animal livestock) was to be sacrificed at the temple for the sustenance of the Levites. Giving is not limited to the tithe or any specific amount, illustrated by Jesus’ comment that a woman who gave a very small amount had given more than those had given large amounts because "while they gave out of their abundance, she gave all she had to live on" (the lesson of the widow's mite, Mark 12.41-44; Luke 21.1-4).

Examples
The Dutch political party "CDA" (Christian Democratic Appeal) lists stewardship as one of its four key ideals. This refers not only to taking care of the environment, but also a principled stand towards human as well as natural resources. A commitment to clear principles, rather than pragmatism, is another facet of stewardship.

Many Christians practice the spiritual discipline of intentional financial stewardship, giving to churches or other ministries.  Fewer, though still a significant number, commit time in service to the needy or in other areas, often utilizing and donating specialized skills and abilities.

Christians Stewardship Ministry
Christian Stewardship Ministries have been growing in popularity around the United States, seeing a rapid growth in the 2000s and 2010s. Inspired by leaders like Larry Burkett, Howard Dayton, and Ron Blue the growth of these ministries has been championed by national leaders and pastors in the stewardship (theology) arena like radio host Dave Ramsey, Pastor Dave Briggs (Central Arizona Church), Pastor Chris Goulard (Saddleback Church), Pastor David Thompson (Gateway Church), Pastor Andy Stanley (North Point Church), and Pastor Rick Warren (Saddleback Church)3.

Due to the popularity of the movement, organizations have grown to support Stewardship Theology understanding around the country: Christian Stewardship Network, Stewardship Pastors Organization, and Stewardship Central.

See also
 Christianity and environmentalism
Ecotheology
 Evangelical environmentalism
 Parable of the talents or minas
 Hima (environmental protection) 
 Kaitiaki
 Judaism and environmentalism
 Religion and environmentalism
 Spiritual ecology
 Laudato si'

Notes

Further reading
 Charles Bugg, "Stewardship" in Holman Bible Dictionary (Holman: Tennessee, 1991), 1303-1304
 Jonathan Merritt, "Green Like God: Divine Plan for Our Planet"

External links
Gaia International, /
 Rabbi Saul Berman (1992), Jewish Environmental Values: The Dynamic Tension Between Nature and Human Needs
 Judaism and the Environment, Coalition on the Environment and Jewish Life

Christian democracy
Environment and religion
Christian ethics